Lordy may refer to:

 Lordy Rodriguez (born 1976), Filipino artist
 Lordy Tugade (born 1977), Filipino basketball player
 I am Going to the Lordy, an 1882 poem